Dubois's seedeater (Sporophila ardesiaca) is a species of bird in the family Thraupidae. It is closely related to, and possibly better considered a subspecies of, the widespread yellow-bellied seedeater. The Dubois's seedeater is endemic to east-central Brazil, where it is found in a wide range of semi-open habitats.

References

Dubois's seedeater
Birds of the Atlantic Forest
Endemic birds of Brazil
Dubois's seedeater
Taxonomy articles created by Polbot